Borts is air-dried meat cut into long strips which are hung in the shade. The Mongolian nomadic lifestyle and the local climatic conditions gave rise to specific methods of preserving meat. The most widespread one is air-drying or 'bortsloh'.

Preparation
The fresh meat is cut into long strips, 2-3 cm thick and 5-7 cm wide. The strips are hung on strings under the roof of a ger (yurt), where the air is free to circulate. After about a month the meat is dry, having turned into small, hard, wooden-like sticks with a brown color. This method of preservation causes the volume of the meat to shrink significantly. The dried borts is broken into small pieces or ground to a coarse and fibrous powder. It is stored in a linen bag, which allows contact with air. In the dry climate of Mongolia, this method of storage preserves the quality of the meat over months, or even years. Nowadays, borts is also industrially manufactured, and can be bought by the kilogram in paper bags. This is very convenient for city dwellers who do not have a ger to dry their meat in. However, traditionalists insist that the taste of those products cannot compete with that of the homemade variety.

Borts is more nutritious, and said to be tastier, than other modern field rations. There is an unconfirmed method from old times: Mongolian nobles relied on borts for months-long journeys. Dried carefully for three years and then ground into a fine powder, until it all could fit through a sieve. It further shrinks volume of the borts so whole cow's meat can fit into a cow's bladder. Just a pinch of borts prepared like this said to able to nourish 3-4 people in a soup form. .

See also

 List of dried foods
Dried meat

External links

Dried meat
Mongolian cuisine